Said Altınordu (born Said Bey, 24 July 1912 – 17 November 1978), alternatively spelled Sait Altınordu, was a Turkish international footballer. Being a one-club man, he was and still is one of the symbolic footballers in the Turkish city of İzmir, along with Vahap Özaltay of Altay S.K. and Fuat Göztepe of Göztepe S.K. His identification with Altınordu S.K. led him to choose the official name of the club as his surname, following the Surname Law of Turkey enacted in 1934.

Altınordu served Altınordu S.K. his entire career, earned 4 caps for Turkey national football team between 1932 and 1937. Winning 6 İzmir Football League titles at Altınordu S.K., he is widely accepted by Altınordu S.K. as the legendary player of the club. He was also part of Turkey's squad at the 1936 Summer Olympics.

In general, Altınordu is reported to have been primarily deployed as a defender, but he also possessed scoring abilities which led him to produce 29 senior goals during his career, leading to him being the top scorer of 1937 Millî Küme campaign with 13 goals. Following his representation of Altınordu S.K. between 1932 and 1937, there were no other Altınordu S.K. player's called-up to the Turkish national team for 78 years, until Çağlar Söyüncü was invited in 2016.

Playing style
According to Nimet, Altınordu's wife, Said Altınordu used to train shooting practices individually with his personal efforts at Alsancak Stadium. According to Erdoğan Sungur, İzmir-based author; who saw Said Altınordu playing live, Altınordu was capable of "making feints, producing 'delicious' shoots, and having a 'great' football intelligence."

Legacy
Altınordu was the role model of Metin Oktay, the iconic player of  Galatasaray S.K. and Turkish international. The youth and academy facilities of Altınordu S.K. are named after Said Altınordu, located in Yeşilyurt county of İzmir, facilitating for teams between U-7 and U-14. In 2016, one of the 15 newly launched ferries of İzmir was named after Altınordu following an online-public poll.

A statue of Altınordu was opened in front of Alsancak Terminal, İzmir, as a part of 91st anniversary of Altınordu S.K. on 27 December 2014. The statue resembles the moment of Altınordu taking the winning shot against Eskişehir Demirspor at the 1935 Turkish Football Championship semi-final game. Arbitrated by Şazi Tezcan, the game was ended 3–2 in favour of Altınordu S.K., held on 4 September 1935, at Taksim Stadium.

Despite the rivalry between their clubs, Altınordu and Vahap Özaltay, who was an Altay S.K. icon, were best friends.

Honours
 Altınordu S.K.
 İzmir Football League (6): 1926–27, 1931–32, 1934–35, 1935–36, 1939–40, 1944–45

Individual
 National Division top scorer (1): 1937 (13 goals)

See also
 List of one-club men in football

References
 Footnotes

 Citations

Bibliography
 Books

External links
 Profile at TFF 

1912 births
1978 deaths
Footballers from Istanbul
Turkish footballers
Association football defenders
Altınordu F.K. players
Süper Lig players
Turkey international footballers
Footballers at the 1936 Summer Olympics
Olympic footballers of Turkey